Commodore Island is a northern Canadian island in eastern Hudson Bay.

References

Islands of Hudson Bay
Uninhabited islands of Qikiqtaaluk Region